Saddan Guambe (born 25 May 1988) is a Mozambican professional footballer who currently plays as a midfielder for ESM Gonfreville.

External links 
 
 

1988 births
Living people
Mozambican footballers
Mozambique international footballers
Association football midfielders
Clube Ferroviário de Maputo footballers
C.D. Maxaquene players
Liga Desportiva de Maputo players
CD Costa do Sol players
ESM Gonfreville players
Mozambique A' international footballers
2022 African Nations Championship players